Daniel Charles Pascoe (born 14 May 1983) is an Australian academic and former first-class cricketer.

Pascoe was born at Canberra in May 1983. He played age-group cricket for the Australian Capital Territory cricket team all the way up to under-19 level. Pascoe studied law at the Australian National University, before going to England to study for his masters and doctorate at Lincoln College at the University of Oxford. Pascoe played first-class cricket for Oxford University, making his debut against Cambridge in The University Match of 2009. He featured for Oxford University in three further University Matches in 2010, 2011 and 2012. In addition to playing for the university, Pascoe also made four first-class appearances for Oxford MCCU between 2010–12. In eight first-class matches, Pascoe scored 229 runs at an average of 25.44 and with a high score of 34. As a slow left-arm orthodox bowler, he took 25 wickets at a bowling average of 25.80. He twice took a five wicket haul, with his best figures of 6 for 68 coming for Oxford MCCU against Middlesex in 2010.

After his studies, Pascoe became an academic lecturing in law. He is a visiting fellow at Fordham Law School and is an assistant professor at City University of Hong Kong. Following his move to Hong Kong, Pascoe played club cricket for Kowloon Cricket Club. He was selected to play for Galaxy Gladiators Lantau, captained by Kumar Sangakkara, in the 2018 Hong Kong T20 Blitz, taking three wickets from his five matches played.

After completing a period of residency, Pascoe became eligible to represent the Hong Kong cricket team. In May 2022, he was named in Hong Kong's side for the 2022 Uganda Cricket World Cup Challenge League B tournament.

Notes and references

External links

1983 births
Living people
People from Canberra
Australian National University alumni
Alumni of Lincoln College, Oxford
Australian cricketers
Oxford University cricketers
Oxford MCCU cricketers
Australian academics
Australian expatriates in Hong Kong
Academic staff of the City University of Hong Kong